Roger A. Windels (born 18 May 1924 in Emelgem - died 13 November 1996 in Bruges) is a Belgian, Flemish politician who served as the Mayor of Torhout, senator and Flemish counsel member. He was also a teacher and founded schools.

Early life 
Even as a child, Windels was surrounded by shoes and he almost continued in the shoemaker world of his father and grandfather. However after finishing preschool, his teacher advised him to become a teacher. He followed his teachers advice and studied at the Normaalschool in Torhout where he graduated with honors on 30 June 1943.

Teaching Years 
Windels worked as a history teacher in the Normaalschool in Torhout from 15 September 1958 to 31 August 1970.

Founding Schools 
Windels founded a number of schools where students could learn for independent professions. He became the principal of the Vrije Handelsinstituut in Bruges and he was the founder and chairman of the training Institute for independent professions and self-employed entrepreneurs in West-Flanders(now known as Syntra-West) from 1960 to 1995.

In 1963, he founded the IVV which is now known as Ter Groene Poorte hotelschool in Bruges. Windels became chairman of the executive power of the schools construction.

Political career 
Windels became a member of the Christian People's Party (CVP) in 1948 and became the party's secretary. His first election experience was during the elections of 26 June 1949.

In 1958, Windels became the chairman of the NCMV in Torhout, during his term he raised the membership number from 78 in 1958 to 256 in 1968 when his term ended. And when in 1963 the Federation for free time, sport activities and community development was created, he became chairman again. Beside that, he also was chairman of the salon for gastronomy.

Between 1961 and 1967, Windels became one of then ministers Albert De Clerck and Adhémar d'Alcantara's advisers. His duty consisted mostly to let administration and private educational initiatives collaborate and to translate the notes of the training schools into laws, royal and ministerial decrees.

He also was a member of the culture council and the Dutch culture community from May 1977 to October 1980, and he was a member of the Flemish council from 21 October 1980 to 12 December 1987.

Senator 
Windels became senator for Bruges in 1977 for CVP, he also became the chairman for the senates commission for education. Besides that he also was vice-chairman of the CVP's senate fraction, vice-chairman of the CVP's Bruges district and chairman of the CVP in Torhout. After finishing his term in 1987, he ended his international career in Belgian politics.

Mayor of Torhout 
Windels was Mayor of the West-Flemish city of Torhout from 1983 to 1991 for CVP. He took the responsibility for the general policy, police and traffic, finances, public health and tourism.

In his term as Mayor, he realised a number of goals including:
 The renewal of the city centre
 New parking options
 Restoring the city's park, including adding a new pond, planting mire trees and other plants and restoring castle Ravenhof
 Expanding the watersupply along a large number of streets on Torhout soil
 Building a new sportcenter which was used for the first time in 1987
 A new bike and hike trail to Wijnendale
 Founding the VZW foundation of Wijnendale castle

During the new 1991 elections, Windels felt that his duty as Mayor was fulfilled and put his favorite candidate forward to succeed him. His favorite candidate was called Norbert De Cuyper and he won the following election.

Personal life 
He married Maria Rammant on 29 July 1948, and had 4 children, 2 girls (Kathleen and Kristien) and 2 boys (Johan and Patrick). After his political career, he lived with his wife in Torhout until his death in 1996.

See also 
 List of mayors of Torhout

References

1924 births
1996 deaths
Mayors of Torhout